Ireland was represented by Maria Christian, with the song "Wait Until the Weekend Comes", at the 1985 Eurovision Song Contest, which took place on 4 May in Gothenburg, Sweden. "Wait Until the Weekend Comes" was chosen as the Irish entry at the national final on 27 March.

Before Eurovision

National final 
The final was held at the studios of broadcaster RTÉ in Dublin, hosted by Gay Byrne. Eight songs took part, with the winner chosen by voting from 11 regional juries. One of the contenders was Marion Fossett, who was a member of Ireland's 1981 representatives Sheeba.

At Eurovision 
On the night of the final Christian performed first in the running order, preceding Finland. At the close of voting "Wait Until the Weekend Comes" had picked up 91 points, placing Ireland 6th of the 19 entries. Only the two final juries, Greece and Luxembourg failed to award the song any points at all. The Irish jury awarded its 12 points to contest winners Norway.

Voting

References 

1985
Countries in the Eurovision Song Contest 1985
Eurovision
Eurovision